The 2015 Savannah Challenger was a professional tennis tournament played on clay courts. It was the sixth edition of the tournament which was part of the 2015 ATP Challenger Tour. It took place in Savannah, United States between 20 and 26 April 2015.

Singles main-draw entrants

Seeds

Other entrants
The following players received wildcards into the singles main draw:
  Frances Tiafoe
  Rhyne Williams
  Ernesto Escobedo 
  Stefan Kozlov

The following player received entry with a protected ranking:
  Tennys Sandgren

The following player received entry as alternate:
  Mitchell Krueger

The following players received entry from the qualifying draw:
  Guillermo Durán
  Tommy Paul
  Julio Peralta 
  Sanam Singh

The following players received entry as a lucky loser:
  Takanyi Garanganga

Doubles main-draw entrants

Seeds

Champions

Singles

 Chung Hyeon def.  James McGee, 6–3, 6–2

Doubles

 Guillermo Durán /  Horacio Zeballos def.  Dennis Novikov /  Julio Peralta, 6–4, 6–3

External links
Official Website

Savannah Challenger
Savannah Challenger
Tennis tournaments in Georgia (U.S. state)